AKB may refer to:
Atka Airport, an airport on Atka Island, Alaska (IATA code AKB)
AKB48, a Japanese girl band
Akihabara Station, JR East station code
Akademibokhandeln, a Swedish chain of book stores
Andrew K. Benton, the seventh president of Pepperdine University
Anna Kinberg Batra, a Swedish politician and former leader of the Moderate Party 2015-2017
Andrew Keenan-Bolger, a musical theatre actor known for Newsies and Tuck Everlasting